The Finland women's national bandy team represents Finland in the Women's Bandy World Championship and other international bandy competitions. It is governed by the Finnish Bandy Association, a member of the Federation of International Bandy (FIB).

History

The first recorded international match between women's bandy teams from Sweden and Finland took place in Helsinki, Finland in 1935 at the Helsingfors Ice Stadium, where a portion of the match was captured by British Pathé.

The next documented international friendly match played by the Finnish national team was held in Kemi in 1980 and ended in a Swedish victory, with a final score of 3–14.

Women's Bandy World Championship
The team has participated in every Women's Bandy World Championship since the first tournament in 2004, which was hosted by Finland in Lappeenranta. Ten years later, Finland hosted the 2014 Women's Bandy World Championship and Lappeenranta once again served as the host city. As of 2022, the team has won five bronze medals, in 2004, 2008, 2012, 2014, and 2022.

Tournament record

World Championship
 2004 –  Won Bronze Medal
 2006 – Finished in 4th place
 2007 – Finished in 5th place
 2008 –  Won Bronze Medal
 2010 – Finished in 5th place
 2012 –  Won Bronze Medal
 2014 –  Won Bronze Medal
 2016 – Finished in 6th place
 2018 – Finished in 4th place
 2020 – Finished in 4th place
 2022 –  Won Bronze Medal

See also
Bandy
Rink bandy
Women's Bandy World Championship
Great Britain women's national bandy team
Sweden women's national bandy team
Russia women's national bandy team
United States women's national bandy team
Norway women's national bandy team
Switzerland women's national bandy team
China women's national bandy team
Canada women's national bandy team
Hungary women's national bandy team
Soviet Union women's national bandy team

References

External links
  

Women's national team
National bandy teams
Bandy